Dunărea Galați was a Romanian professional football club from Galați, Galați county, south-east Romania, founded in 1970. The club was dissolved in 2014.

History

The club was founded in 1970, took the place of Oțelul Galați in Divizia B and has played for 5 seasons in the Liga I.

For a brief period, it was Galați's main team, but after the rise of Oțelul in the 1980s, it is seen only in the Liga II and the Liga III.

They were supposed to be relegated to Liga III at the end of the 2007–08 season, but they managed to maintain their second league position due to the withdrawal of FCM Câmpina.

The 2009–10 season started well, the team reaching the Round of 32 of the Romanian Cup, being eliminated by cup holders CFR Cluj. They finished 11th in the league.

Chronology of names

Honours

Liga I:
Winners (0):
Best finish: 14th in 1979–80

Liga II:
Winners (4): 1973–74, 1975–76, 1978–79, 1982–83
Runners-up (3): 1977–78, 1984–85, 1991–92

Liga III:
Winners (2): 1989–90, 2003–04
Runners-up (3): 1987–88, 1988–89, 1990–91

Liga IV - Galați County:
Winners (1): 1992–93

References

External links
 Dunarea's page at liga2.ro
 Dunarea's page at campionate.ro
 Dunarea's page at frf.ro

 
Association football clubs established in 1970
Sport in Galați
Football clubs in Galați County
Defunct football clubs in Romania
Liga I clubs
Liga II clubs
1970 establishments in Romania
Association football clubs disestablished in 2014
2014 disestablishments in Romania